The Epic Center is a high-rise building located at 301 N. Main St. in Wichita, Kansas. At 320 feet (top floor)/ 385 feet (tip of sloped roof), it is the tallest building in the state of Kansas.  The tallest structure in the state is the KWCH 12 Tower.

History 
Construction of the Epic Center began in October 1985. It officially opened for business in 1987. Created as a lure for businesses to the downtown area, the Epic Center helped create a "big city" feel for Wichita at a time when the economy was fluctuating. The building has 22 stories above ground level.

Originally, the plans called for two twin towers to be built, but those plans were scrapped in favor of a single tower due to the fear that the occupancy level would never reach near capacity.  At the time, this led to a local joke referring to the development as "Epic Off-Center", but that epithet is now largely forgotten.

In 2007, in a $1.4 billion transaction the Epic Center, One and Two Brittany Place and 31 other buildings, were acquired by real estate investment firm Behringer Harvard, when it acquired IPC US REIT.

Today 
Today the building's tenants include law firms, banking and loan corporations, a field office of the Secret Service and Federal Bureau of Investigation, and many other businesses.

The Epic Center has   of office space. Hinkle Elkouri Law Firm LLC, accounting firm Allen, Gibbs & Houlik LC and the North American headquarters of manufacturing firm Viega NA Inc. are its largest tenants.

See also
List of tallest buildings in Wichita
List of tallest buildings by U.S. state

References

Buildings and structures in Wichita, Kansas
Skyscrapers in Kansas
Skyscraper office buildings in Kansas
Office buildings completed in 1987
1987 establishments in Kansas